Nawe Kele is a village located in District Swat Valley, Union Council Kota, Tehsil Barikot, Pakistan. The population of the village is approximately 2500.

Populated places in Swat District